The women's double sculls competition during the 2000 Summer Olympics in Sydney, Australia took place at Sydney International Regatta Centre.

Competition format
This rowing event is a double scull event, meaning that each boat is propelled by a pair of rowers. The "scull" portion means that each rower uses two oars, one on each side of the boat; this contrasts with sweep rowing in which each rower has one oar and rows on only one side. The competition consists of multiple rounds. Finals were held to determine the placing of each boat; these finals were given letters with those nearer to the beginning of the alphabet meaning a better ranking. Semifinals were named based on which finals they fed, with each semifinal having two possible finals.

With 10 boats in heats, the best boats qualify directly for "Final A". All other boats progress to the repechage round, which offers a second chance to qualify for "Final A". Unsuccessful boats from the repechage must proceed to final B, which determines the last four places, from 7–10. The final ranking for this event was based on the order of finish. The top three teams earned Olympic medals for placing first, second, and third, while the remaining "Final A" teams placed fourth through sixth, according to their final finish.

Schedule
All times are Australian Time (UTC+10)

Results

Heats
The winner of each heat advanced to Final A, remainder goes to the repechage.

Heat 1

Heat 2

Repechage
First two qualify to Final A, the remainder to final B.

Repechage 1

Repechage 2

Finals

Final B

Final A

References

External links
Official Report of the 2000 Sydney Summer Olympics
Rowing Results

Rowing at the 2000 Summer Olympics
Women's rowing at the 2000 Summer Olympics
Women's events at the 2000 Summer Olympics